Dundurn may refer to:

 Dundurn, Saskatchewan, Canada
CFD Dundurn, a Canadian Forces facility near Dundurn, Saskatchewan
 Rural Municipality of Dundurn No. 314, Saskatchewan, Canada
 Dundurn, Scotland, an ancient Pictish fort, in Strathearn, Scotland
 Dundurn Castle, Hamilton, Ontario, Canada
 Dundurn Press, a Canadian publishing company